Clostridial aminopeptidase (Clostridium histolyticum aminopeptidase) is an enzyme. This enzyme catalyses the following chemical reaction

 Release of any N-terminal amino acid, including proline and hydroxyproline, but no cleavage of Xaa-Pro-

This enzyme is secreted enzyme from Clostridium histolyticum. It requiring Mn2+ or Co2+.

References

External links 
 

EC 3.4.11